This register of SS leaders in general's rank includes the members of the Allgemeine SS and Waffen-SS, in line with the appropriate SS seniority list (Dienstaltersliste der Waffen-SS) from July 1, 1944. It contains (incomplete) further SS Honour leaders (SS-Ehrenführer) and SS-Rank leaders for special duty (SS-Rangführer zur besonderen Verwendung), short for SS Honour – and rank leaders (SS-Ehren- und Rangführer).

List of SS-Oberst-Gruppenführer 
SS-Oberst-Gruppenführer (literal: SS-Colonel group leader), short SS-Obstgruf, was from 1942 to 1945 the highest commissioned rank in the Schutzstaffel (SS), with the exception of Reichsführer-SS. SS-Obstgruf was comparable to four-star ranks in English speaking armed forces (today equivalent to NATO OF-9).

List of SS-Obergruppenführer 
SS-Obergruppenführer (literal: SS-Senior group leader), short SS-Ogruf, was the second highest commissioned rank in the SS, comparable to three-star ranks in English speaking armed forces (today equivalent to NATO OF-8).

List of SS-Gruppenführer 
SS-Gruppenführer (literal: SS-Group leader), short SS-Gruf, was the third highest commissioned rank in the SS, comparable to two-star ranks in English speaking armed forces (today equivalent to NATO OF-7).

List of SS-Brigadeführer 
SS-Brigadeführer (literal: SS-Brigade leader), short SS-Brif, was the lowest general rank in the SS, comparable to one-star ranks in English speaking armed forces (today equivalent to NATO OF-6).

See also
Comparative ranks of Nazi Germany
Generaloberst (Nazi Germany)
List of Nazi Party leaders and officials

Sources 
Andreas Schulz, Günter Wegmann, Dieter Zinke: Die Generale der Waffen-SS und der Polizei 1933–1945. Biblio-Verlag, Bissendorf 2003 ff., . (in 6 volumes).
Volume 1: A–G (Abraham–Gutenberger), Bissendorf 2003, 
Volume 2: H–K (Hachtel–Kutschera), Bissendorf 2005, 
Volume 3: LA–PL (Lammerding–Plesch), Bissendorf 2008, 
Volume 4: PO–SCHI (Podzun–Schimana), Bissendorf 2009, 
Volume 5: SCHL–T (Schlake–Turner), Bissendorf 2011, 
Volume 6: U-Z (Ullmann–Zottmann), Bissendorf 2012, 
Wolfgang Graf: Österreichische SS-Generale, Himmlers verlässliche Vasallen. Hermagoras-Verlag, Klagenfurt / Ljubljana / Wien 2012, 

SS generals
Nazi-related lists
Lists of generals